Oenothera caespitosa, known commonly as tufted evening primrose, desert evening primrose, rock-rose evening primrose, or fragrant evening primrose, is a perennial plant of the genus Oenothera native to much of western and central North America, in habitats such as talus slopes and sandy plains. It is normally night-blooming.

The plant is considered good for rock gardens. There are many subtaxa, referred to as subspecies or varieties.

Description 
Oenothera caespitosa grows to 10 centimeters (4 inches) tall. It has no stems, with flowers and leaves growing directly from the root crown. The four-petaled white flowers open at dusk and wilt the next morning, turning pink. A notch gives them a heart shape.

Ecology
The plant is a larval host to the white-lined sphinx moth.

Oenothera caespitosa is dependent on hawkmoths, including the five-spotted hawkmoth (Manduca quinquemaculata) for pollination.

Similar species
Oenothera deltoides is very similar, with short stems and slightly smaller flowers.

References

External links
Jepson Manual Treatment
CalPhoto gallery

caespitosa
Night-blooming plants
Flora of North America